Oleynitsky is a rural locality (a khutor) in Volokonovsky District, Belgorod Oblast, Russia. The population was 25 as of 2010. There is one street.

Geography 
Oleynitsky is located 22 km north of Volokonovka (the district's administrative centre) by road. Olkhov is the nearest rural locality.

References 

Rural localities in Volokonovsky District